Angel Wong Hiu Ying is a Hong Kong gymnast.  She competed at the 2012 Summer Olympics.

Senior career

2008 
Earlier in 2008, Angel competed at the Doha World Cup, winning a silver medal. Later, Angel competed at the Madrid World Cup later in the year. She qualified to the final but in the finals, she fell and came 8th.

2009 
At the World Championships in London, she placed 58th in the all-around and 25th on Vault.

2010 
She won a silver and a bronze in the Doha and Ghent World Cups on Vault and she placed 13th on Vault at the 2010 World Championships in Rotterdam, Netherlands.

2011 
At the World Championships in Tokyo, she placed 84th all-around.

2012 
She qualified to the Olympics via the Test Event in January. S

Eponymous skill
Wong has one eponymous skill listed in the Code of Points.

References

1987 births
Living people
Olympic gymnasts of Hong Kong
Hong Kong female artistic gymnasts
Gymnasts at the 2010 Asian Games
Gymnasts at the 2014 Asian Games
Gymnasts at the 2012 Summer Olympics
Universiade medalists in gymnastics
Universiade medalists for Hong Kong
Asian Games competitors for Hong Kong
Originators of elements in artistic gymnastics